The red-legged thrush (Turdus plumbeus) is a species of bird in the family Turdidae. Native to the Caribbean, it is found in the Bahamas, Cayman Islands, Cuba, Dominica, Hispaniola (the Dominican Republic and Haiti) and Puerto Rico. It formerly occurred on the Swan Islands, Honduras, but was extirpated there. 

In Puerto Rico, the red-legged thrush is known as zorzal de patas coloradas.

Habitat
Its natural habitats are subtropical or tropical dry forests, subtropical or tropical moist lowland forests, subtropical or tropical moist montane forests, and heavily degraded former forest. This species may be considered the Caribbean counterpart of the American robin, as it has similar habits, including being a common visitor to gardens and lawns.

Description
It is mainly bluish-grey above and lighter-grey below with a white and black throat with a striped appearance. The legs, bill and eye ring are bright orange-red. There is notable variation in plumage between the subspecies.

Taxonomy
Six subspecies are described:
 T. p. plumbeus – Linnaeus, 1758: nominate; found on the northern Bahamas islands.
 T. p. schistaceus – (Baird, S.F., 1864): found in eastern Cuba. Has beige-orange color on rear flanks and vent area. Bill is dark red with dusky tip.
 T. p. rubripes – Temminck, 1826: found in central and western Cuba and on Isla de la Juventud. Has more white in throat and malar area. It also has orange lower flanks, belly and vent.
 T. p. coryi – (Sharpe, 1902): found on the Cayman Islands. Paler and with less orange on underparts than T. p. rubripes.
 T. p. ardosiaceus – Vieillot, 1822: found on Hispaniola (the Dominican Republic and Haiti) and Puerto Rico. Has darker underparts and less white in the undertail.
 T. p. albiventris – Sclater, PL, 1889: found on Dominica. Has orange bill, feet and eye ring.
The IUCN Red List considers T. p. rubripes and T. p. ardosiaceus to be their own species, as the western red-legged thrush and eastern red-legged thrush, respectively.

Gallery

Diet
Its food is mostly fruits, but a third of its diet is animal matter: insects (caterpillars, beetles, ants, crickets, wasps), plus occasional snails, frogs, lizards and birds' eggs.

References

External links

 Red-legged thrush Image at Animal Diversity Web
 
 
 
 
 
 

red-legged thrush
Endemic birds of the Caribbean
Birds of the Dominican Republic
Birds of Dominica
Birds of Haiti
Birds of Cuba
Birds of Puerto Rico
Birds of the Bahamas
Birds of the Cayman Islands
Birds of the Caribbean
red-legged thrush
red-legged thrush
Taxonomy articles created by Polbot